The Ikelemba River is a river in the Democratic Republic of the Congo. It is a left tributary of the Congo River.

Location

The Ikelemba River flows in an arc from east to west.
It joins the Congo from the east just north of where the Ruki River enters the Congo River.

Colonial period

The explorer Henry Morton Stanley visited the region. 
He estimated it would provide  of river course accessible to trade, and said it was the commercial reserve of the Bakuti tribe.
Stanley speculated that the Ikelemba, Lulungu (Lulonga River) and Mohindu might be connected by a system of channels running through a low jungly forest.

The Ikelemba company was founded in the Congo Free State on 29 October 1898 to exploit the Ikelemba River, with a capital of 500,000 francs.
In the first two years the comnpany harvested about 5 tonnes of rubber each month, and cleared  to plant coffee, cocoa and rubber trees.
After this results were poorer, and the company suffered from the fall in rubber prices.
In 1910 all of the company's assets were transferred to the newly formed Société Equatoriale Congolaise Lulonga-Ikelemba.

Notes

Citations

Sources

Rivers of the Democratic Republic of the Congo